Bahau (Kajan) is a Kayanic language of Borneo.

External links

Languages of Indonesia
Languages of Malaysia
Kayan–Murik languages